Aqaq is the Syriac form of the name Acacius. It may refer to:

Acacius of Amida, bishop, died 425
Acacius of Beroea, bishop 378–437
Acacius of Seleucia-Ctesiphon, patriarch 485–496